Oktyabrskoye is a rural locality (a selo) in Kizlyarsky Selsoviet, Kizlyarsky District, Republic of Dagestan, Russia. The population was 348 as of 2010. There are 5 streets.

Geography 
Oktyabrskoye is located 10 km northeast of Kizlyar (the district's administrative centre) by road. Proletarskoye and Shkolnoye are the nearest rural localities.

Nationalities 
Avars and Russians live there.

References 

Rural localities in Kizlyarsky District